Mount Haley Township is a civil township of Midland County in the U.S. state of Michigan. The population was 1,678 at the 2010 census.

Geography
According to the United States Census Bureau, the township has a total area of 23.8 square miles (61.6 km), all land.

Communities
Gordonville was a settlement centered initially on a shingle mill. It had a post office starting in 1875 originally under the name Headache. Later that year it was renamed to Bradford. The post office was renamed Gordonville in 1906. The post office closed in 1910.

Demographics
As of the census of 2010, there were 1,678 people, 616 households, and 468 families residing in the township. The racial makeup of the township was 97.88% White, 0.85% Native American, 0.42% Asian, 0.30% from other races, and 0.54% from two or more races. Hispanic or Latino of any race were 0.91% of the population.

There were 616 households, out of which 34.9% had children under the age of 18 living with them, 66.7% were married couples living together, 5.5% had a female householder with no husband present, and 24.0% were non-families in 2000. 19.2% of all households were made up of individuals, and 5.4% had someone living alone who was 65 years of age or older.  The average household size was 2.69 and the average family size was 3.09 in 2000.

In 2000, the township the population was spread out, with 25.8% under the age of 18, 8.3% from 18 to 24, 31.8% from 25 to 44, 25.2% from 45 to 64, and 8.9% who were 65 years of age or older. The median age was 36 years. For every 100 females, there were 106.5 males.  For every 100 females age 18 and over, there were 102.0 males.

The median income for a household in the township was $42,321, and the median income for a family was $47,153. Males had a median income of $38,875 versus $21,800 for females. The per capita income for the township was $18,553.  About 5.8% of families and 8.3% of the population were below the poverty line, including 10.0% of those under age 18 and 7.3% of those age 65 or over.

References

Notes

Sources

External links 
 Mount Haley Township Web site

Townships in Midland County, Michigan
Townships in Michigan